The 2016 Florida Republican presidential primary was held on March 15, 2016, with 99 delegates being allocated on a winner-take-all basis. Businessman Donald Trump scored a decisive victory in the state, defeating Senator Marco Rubio by nearly 20 points. Rubio had previously vowed to continue his campaign regardless of the results in Florida, but suspended his campaign after the state was called for Trump.

Results

Analysis 
Donald Trump won a landslide victory in Florida by a margin of 18.7 percentage points against 3 other candidates on the ballot, and carried every county besides Miami-Dade (won by Marco Rubio). Donald Trump had several significant investments in the state through his real estate company. According to the New York Times, Mr. Trump "was able to appeal to voters with his message of economic populism and his hard line on immigration" in the Sunshine State. 

According to exit polls, Trump swept all age groups, income levels, and educational attainment levels. His particular area of strength was with whites without a college degree, whom he won 54–22 over Marco Rubio. Trump also won born-again and Evangelical Christians 46–24, and white born-again Evangelical Christians 49–19. He also carried Protestants 45-24 and Catholics 50–33. 

In terms of voters' primary concerns, Trump won over all groups, performing particularly well among those who worried about terrorism (he won 60–16) and those who worried most about the economy (he won 43–30). He won a particularly large victory among those whose family financial situation was "falling behind", among those who called themselves "dissatisfied" or "angry" about the federal government, and among those who said they felt betrayed by Republican politicians. He won among voters who said the U.S. support for Israel is "Not Strong Enough" 48–26. An overwhelming majority of voters said they support Trump's proposed Muslim ban.

Trump swept most regions of the state, winning in the Panhandle with 48 percent (Rubio, 25%; Cruz, 21%; Kasich, 7%), in Orlando with 49 percent (Rubio, 27%; Cruz, 17%; Kasich, 5%; Carson, 1%), in the Tampa Bay area with 46 percent (Rubio, 23%; Cruz, 18%; Kasich, 10%), and in the Gulf Coast and Mid-Florida with 48 percent (Rubio, 21%; Cruz, 18%; Kasich, 7%; Carson, 1%).

Rubio, for his part, won in Miami 42-39 as compared to Trump (Cruz, 10%; Kasich, 6%; Carson, 1%).  While Trump won the state's white vote 51-22 as compared to Rubio, Rubio won Florida's Hispanic/Latino vote 52-26 as compared to Trump, which was 15% of the state's electorate. Compared to Trump, Rubio won Cubans 63–17, other Hispanics 40–38, and non-whites 45–27.

After losing his home state of Florida, Rubio withdrew from the race. As The New York Times described in its analysis of the primary results, Rubio "ran for president offering his youthful optimism and Cuban-American heritage as the embodiment of a new and more diverse generation of Republican leadership, but ultimately failed to galvanize voters in a much darker mood [...]"

Trump would later go on to win the nomination and then become the President of the United States. During his term, his official home state was also changed to Florida.

References

Republican primary
Florida
2016
March 2016 events in the United States